Gerard James McGowan (born 4 August 1944 in Kilwinning, Scotland), is a Scottish footballer who played as a left winger in the English Football League.

References

External links

1944 births
Living people
Scottish footballers
Association football midfielders
Oldham Athletic A.F.C. players
Hyde United F.C. players
Buxton F.C. players
English Football League players